The following lists events that happened during 1971 in the Union of Soviet Socialist Republics.

Incumbents
 General Secretary of the Communist Party of the Soviet Union: Leonid Brezhnev
 Premier of the Soviet Union: Nikolai Bulganin
 Chairman of the Russian SFSR: Mikhail Yasnov

Events

January
 January 1 - Veronika Mavrikievna and Avdotya Nikitichna, a comic variety duet of actors, appear in the telecast 'Terem-Teremok'.

April
 April 19 - The Soviet Union launches Salyut 1.

Births
 February 27 - Zaal Udumashvili, Georgian politician
 April 21 - Valentin Morkov, Russian professional football coach and a former player

Deaths
 January 10 - Nadezhda Peshkova, artist (born 1901)
 June 18 - Vladimir Biryukov, lexicographer (born 1888)
 July 22 - Roman Mashkov, military intelligence officer (born 1922)
September 11 - Nikita Khrushchev, former First Secretary of the Communist Party of the Soviet Union (born 1894)
 September 28 - Vasily Butusov, footballer (born 1892)

References

See also
1971 in fine arts of the Soviet Union
List of Soviet films of 1971

 
1970s in the Soviet Union
Soviet Union
Soviet Union
Soviet Union